A list of films produced by the Marathi language film industry based in Maharashtra in the year 1965.

1965 Releases
A list of Marathi films released in 1965.

References

Lists of 1965 films by country or language
 Marathi
1965